The 2009–10 Season of BAI Basket (32nd edition) ran from November 13, 2009 to June 15, 2010, with 12 teams playing in three different stages: in stage one (regular season) teams played a double round robin system. In stage two, the six best teams played a single round robin tournament in serie A and the last six did the same for the consolation group, serie B. Finally, in stage three (final four) the best four teams from serie A played in a round robin at four rounds for the title. The winners of the regular season and of the serie A are awarded a bonus point for the serie A and the final four, respectively.

BAI Basket Participants (2009–10 Season)

Regular Season (November 13, 2009 - March 30, 2010

Regular Season Standings

As the regular season winner, Primeiro de Agosto is awarded a bonus point for the group stage.

Group Stage (April 20–30, 2010)

Serie A

Serie B

Serie A

As the group stage winner, Primeiro de Agosto is awarded a bonus point for the final four.

Serie B

5th–8th  Place (May 18 - June 15, 2010)

Final Four (May 18 - June 15, 2010)

R. do Libolo vs. Petro Atlético

1º de Agosto vs. ASA

1º de Agosto vs. Petro Atlético

ASA vs. R. do Libolo

Petro Atlético vs. ASA

R. do Libolo vs. 1º de Agosto

Final standings

Awards
2010 BAI Basket MVP
  Kikas (Primeiro de Agosto)

2010 BAI Basket Top Scorer
  Reggie Moore (Recreativo do Libolo)

2010 BAI Basket Top Rebounder
  Eduardo Mingas (Petro Atlético)

2010 BAI Basket Top Assists
  Paulo Santana (Petro Atlético)

See also
 2010 Angola Basketball Cup
 2010 Angola Basketball Super Cup
 2010 Victorino Cunha Cup

External links
Official Website 
Eurobasket.com League Page

References

Angolan Basketball League seasons
League
Angola